Frederick or Fred Burton may refer to:

 Frederick Burton (actor) (1871–1957), American actor
 Frederick Burton (alpine skier) (born 1959), British former alpine skier
 Frederick Burton (Australian cricketer) (1865–1929), Australian wicket-keeper
 Frederick Burton (English cricketer) (1885–1978), English cricketer
 Frederic William Burton (1816–1900), Irish painter
 Fred Burton (footballer) (1918–1997), Australian rules footballer
 Fred Burton (security expert), expert on security, terrorists and terrorist organizations